Florian Riedel (born 9 April 1990) is a German professional footballer who plays as a right-back for Regionalliga Nord club TSV Havelse.

Career
Riedel was born in Werdau, East Germany. He started his professional career with Hertha BSC, making his first appearance on 31 July 2008 in the 2008–09 UEFA Cup first qualifying round second leg against FC Nistru Otaci. He was substituted on in the 63rd minute. On 31 August 2010, the last day of the transfer window, Riedel left Hertha BSC, having been relegated to the reserves, and joined Dutch club AGOVV Apeldoorn.

In summer 2012, Riedel joined 1. FC Kaiserslautern. After 12 appearances in the 2. Bundesliga and after playing mostly for the reserves, he was released from his contract in summer 2015.

On 19 January 2016, Riedel signed for Eintracht Trier until June 2017.

References

External links
 
 Florian Riedel at Voetbal International 
 

1990 births
Living people
People from Werdau
Association football midfielders
German footballers
Hertha BSC players
Hertha BSC II players
AGOVV Apeldoorn players
VfL Osnabrück players
1. FC Kaiserslautern players
SV Eintracht Trier 05 players
FC Viktoria 1889 Berlin players
VfB Lübeck players
TSV Havelse players
2. Bundesliga players
3. Liga players
Regionalliga players
Eerste Divisie players
Footballers from Saxony
German expatriate footballers
Expatriate footballers in the Netherlands
German expatriate sportspeople in the Netherlands